Zirach may refer to:
 Ziraj, Birjand County, South Khorasan Province, Iran
 Zirenj, Qaen County, South Khorasan Province, Iran